Chakravarthi Thirumagal is a 1957 Indian Tamil language film starring M. G. Ramachandran, Anjali Devi and S. Varalakshmi. The film, directed by P. Neelakantan, was released on 18 January 1957. It was a box office success.

Plot 

Prince Udayasuriyan wins a tough competition to marry Princess Kalamani. Durga and Bhairavan plot to ruin their lives. Durga plans to take the queen's place in order to live with Udayasuriyan. Meanwhile, Bhairavan abducts Kalamani from the palace. The rest of the film deals with Udayasduriyan foiling his enemies' plan in order to save the princess.

Cast

Soundtrack 
The music was composed by G. Ramanathan. Lyrics were by Thanjai N. Ramaiah Dass, K. D. Santhanam, Ku. Sa. Krishnamurthy, Ku. Ma. Balasubramaniam, and Pattukkottai Kalyanasundaram.

Release 
Chakravarthi Thirumagal was released on 18 January 1957, and became a success at the box office.

References

External links 
 

1950s Tamil-language films
1957 films
Films based on Indian folklore
Films directed by P. Neelakantan
Films scored by G. Ramanathan
Indian epic films